George Marion Johnson (May 22, 1900 – August 11, 1987) was an American lawyer and professor who was the first vice chancellor of the University of Nigeria, Nsukka.

Early life and education
Johnson was born in Albuquerque, New Mexico and raised in San Bernardino, California; he earned Bachelor's and LL.D. degrees from the University of California, Berkeley in 1923 and 1929, and in 1938 earned a J.S.D. there, one of the first African American holders of the degree.

Career
In 1929 Johnson started practicing as a tax attorney; he was subsequently the first African American California State Assistant Tax Counsel.

He moved to academia as a professor at Howard University, and then in World War II was acting General Counsel to the Fair Employment Practice Committee, which oversaw the prevention of discrimination in defense industries. In 1946 he became dean of the Howard University School of Law, where he founded the Howard Law Review Journal. He also assisted one of his predecessors, Charles Hamilton Houston, in the preparation of Supreme Court briefs on behalf of the NAACP. In 1957 he was appointed to the U.S. Commission on Civil Rights.

In 1960, when Nigeria became independent, Johnson was a founder of the University of Nigeria and was appointed its first vice chancellor. He held the position until 1964, when he was succeeded by Glen L. Taggart. He subsequently worked at Michigan State University as a professor of education and at the University of Hawaii as a professor of law and director of the Preadmission Program.

Personal life and death
Johnson was married to Evelyn Johnson. He died in 1987 in Honolulu.

References 

1900 births
1987 deaths
African-American lawyers
UC Berkeley School of Law alumni
Howard University School of Law faculty
Academic staff of the University of Nigeria
Michigan State University faculty
William S. Richardson School of Law faculty
20th-century African-American people
Vice-Chancellors of the University of Nigeria